The Ševčiny mine (Czech: Ševčinský důl, also důl Ševčiny or  šachta císaře Františka Josefa I or  francšachta)  is a retired silver and lead ore mine at Březové Hory, Czech republic. Today the mine is a Czech national monument and is managed by the Mining Museum Příbram.

The mine was given its name according to the Ševčiny vein, which was one of the most important veins in the mineral district Březové Hory.

The maximum depth reached at Ševčiny mine was 1 108.2 meters in 1914. The mine consists 35 floors and, like most mines in the area, is connected with the other mines by the Dědičná adit. The pit profile is 5.4x3 m.

History 
The mine was founded in 1813 at the instigation of the Higher Mining Authority, who proposed that a new pit be established on the Martyrs' vein (Mučednická žíla). A pump shaft already has existed here since 1600. Since the vein led vertically downwards, only few horizontal corridors had to be driven.

Mine heyday was the second half of the 19th century. In 1878, a depth of 433.3 m was reached. In 1880, a steam engine was installed at the mine, allowing mining from greater depths. This led to new operational buildings construction in 1879-80. The maximum mine depth was reached in 1909 - 1092.1 m on the 32nd floor. In 1884, a narrow-gauge mining railway was established to connect the Ševčiny mine, through the Ševčiny adit, with the treatment plants at the Vojtěch mine.

In 1910 the pit operation was stopped for economic reasons, although it was sporadically mined during the 20th century.

Present 
In 1978, after the mining in the Březové Hory district was suspended, the pit operation ceased and in 1989 the pit was closed by backfill. In 1978-79 the mine became the foundation of the newly established Mining Museum Příbram. The Ševčiny mine complex includes:

 Shaft building
 Engine room (mining supercharger), Gallows Frame
 Show room
 Cáchovna (registration room, 1880) - exposition of mining history
 Driving wheel from mining lift used from the 16th till the 19th century, Middle Ages pulley and miners' bell tower
 miners' spa

Despite its relatively small dimensions, the shaft building with the mining tower (the only preserved steel mining tower in Březové Hory) represents a jewel of industrial architecture of central European importance. It can be considered one of the most beautiful (and also the best preserved and most valuable heritage) mining towers in central Europe.

Recognition 
It was declared a Czech national monument in 1958 and was added to the national cultural monuments list in 2014 as part of the Mining Monuments Complex in Březové Hory.

In 2007 the Czech National bank issued a 2500 CZK commemorative gold coin as part of the Industrial Heritage Sites series. The coin was designed by Luboš Charvát.

References 

Mining in the Czech Republic
National Cultural Monuments of the Czech Republic
Buildings and structures in the Czech Republic
Mining communities in the Czech Republic
Silver mines
Příbram
Příbram District
Lead mines